The Osborne family are a fictional family in the long-running Channel 4 soap opera, Hollyoaks. Introduced to the show in 1996, The family moved to Hollyoaks village in 1996, although Ruth Osborne had previously lived in the Village. The characters have been involved in storylines such as dealing with a Gambling addiction, Ruth relationship with Kurt Benson, Jack's affair with Dawn Cunningham, a fake death scam for insurance money, financial troubles, Jack three marriages and fostering a child. Throughout their tenure on the serial, the Osbornes have owned the Dog in the Pond. Hollyoaks official website has described the Osborne family as belonging in the Dog in the Pond and as being the " rightfully at the helm" of the public house.

The current Osborne family consists of patriarch Jack Osborne (Jimmy McKenna), his son Darren Osborne (Ashley Taylor Dawson) and Darren and Nancy's children Oscar and Morgan. Additionally, several others may be considered Osbornes through marriage; Nancy (Jessica Fox) and Charlie Dean (Charlie Behan). Tom Cunningham (Ellis Hollins) and Brooke Hathaway (Tylan Grant) have been adopted by the family.

History
The Osborne family were created in 1996 by Phil Redmond as an expansion to Ruth Osborne's family who had lived as a student in Hollyoaks Village. Jack Osborne and his wife Celia Osborne arrived with their son Darren Osborne on 18 November 1996 and soon after bought The Dog in the Pond from Celia's brother Greg Andersen. Celia and Jack met at a young age and married when they were both twenty. Jack and Celia had two children together, first having Ruth then in 1983 having Darren. The pair remained together until 1997 when they split after 23 years of marriage, after Celia discovered Jack had cheated on her. Celia left and took Darren with her. Darren rejoined the family 2 years later. Ruth married Kurt Benson in 1997 and later divorced him in 1999 before he died soon after. Jack remarried a year after his split from Celia, this time to Jill Patrick and they remained together until her untimely demise because of a brain tumor a year later. In 2003 Jack's Niece Natalie Osborne moved to Hollyoaks village then later her sister, Rachel Osborne joined her in 2004, before both leaving later that year. Five years since his last marriage Jack remarried this time to Frankie Dean. In 2009 Darren married Hannah Ashworth while drunk and the pair later made an attempt at marriage before splitting. Darren Osborne impregnated Suzanne Ashworth and she later gave birth to twins which they named Jack and Francine Osborne. The Osborne family are the longest serving owners and Jack the longest serving landlord of The Dog in the Pond serving for 12 years.

In Hollyoaks
Ruth arrived as a student and began to date Kurt Benson. The Osbornes arrive in Hollyoaks, where they join Ruth. Jack and Celia become the landlords of The Dog in the Pond, after Celia's brother Greg decides to sell up following the death of his daughter Natasha. Jack is revealed to be the father of teenager Dawn Cunningham's child Bethany, who needs a kidney transplant. Jack donates one of his kidneys to the daughter he has never known. Dawn's sister Jude ends up telling everyone in The Dog about his secret child. Celia leaves for America taking Darren with her. Celia and Jack later divorce. Darren eventually returns 2 years later.

Ruth starts getting hassle from Spike who tried to entrap her, but Kurt intervened and accidentally pushed Spike off scaffolding. Kurt was later charged. Kurt became paranoid that Ruth thought he was guilty, leading them to break up. Kurt left for Hull so Ruth followed him and they got married. Spike trapped Ruth in a room and tried to force himself on her, but Rob Hawthorne stepped in to rescue her.

Jack and Jill Patrick begin a relationship, eventually getting married. Jill reveals she has a fatal brain tumour. Jill eventually dies and Jack promised to look after her children. Ruth learned that Kurt was having an affair with Kate Patrick, ending their marriage. Ruth and Kate fought which led to Kate trying to drown her. In a fit of rage, Kurt intervened, trying to teach Kate a lesson by drowning her. Ruth and Kurt realise that they were not right for each other, prompting Kurt to leave Hollyoaks. Some time later Ruth was told that Kurt had died.

Follow by the separation of Kurt, Ruth began a relationship with Lewis Richardson, but they both agreed to keep their relationship a secret. Ruth took a break from her relationship with Lewis and met Luke Morgan who seduced her which led Lewis to end their relationship. Ruth decided to move to the states, but Lewis arrived at the airport in time to stop her leaving, in which he succeeded. Ruth found out that she was pregnant and without telling Lewis, had an abortion. Ruth and Lewis finally broke up after he slept with Lorraine Wilson. In Hollyoaks: Movin' On, Lewis beat-up Ruth before trying to force himself on her, before leaving Ruth for dead. Ruth while in hospital received news Lewis had died after committing suicide. Ruth left Hollyoaks for a new life in London.

In 2003, Natalie Osborne, Jack's troubled niece, arrived from Scotland for the half-term after her parents have marital trouble. Natalie starts at Hollyoaks High School. However, her older sister Rachel arrives and tells Jack that Natalie is hiding the fact she has been underachieving in School. Jack sends her back home. Scott decided to teach Darren a lesson for scamming him by locking the doors of The Loft and setting fire to it. Scott fell down the stairs of The Loft and pleaded to Darren for help, but Darren left Scott for dead. No trace of Scott was found and a year later, Scott started threatening Darren to pay back the money he had scammed off him. Darren pleaded with Scott not to kill him. Scott was about to attack Darren when the police arrived and arrested him.

After five years being a widowed, since the death of Jill, Jack begins a relationship with Frankie Dean after the collapse of her marriage to Johnno, and the pair later marry. Jack and Frankie decide to foster a child. They foster Barry Newton. Darren develops an addiction to gambling. Jack gives Darren half of the Dog in recognition of his maturity. During a game of poker with Warren Fox, he bets his half of The Dog, which Warren wins. After finding this out, Jack suffers a heart attack and Darren is told to leave the house. Jack, Frankie, Newt and Louise are held hostage at The pub. Outside, Darren fights with the police to try to get inside to save his father. Darren is shot by the one of the hostage takers while trying to save his family, but he recovered. Warren then signs his half of The Dog over to Jack again for a low price. Despite this low price, the family go through financial difficulties, and Jack begins watering down drinks. Seeing no other way, Jack decides to commit suicide so his family can claim his life insurance money. However, Darren stops him. They then discover the body of Eamon Fisher. Darren tells Jack that they could fake his death, claiming Jack is the deceased body. Jack goes along with this and his family are horrified at his apparent death. Ruth returns briefly for his funeral. Frankie discovers Jack is alive and the pair agree to flee to Spain. Niall Rafferty is planning to kill his family so Jack and Darren as the pair rush to find them. Jack bursts in and tells Niall it is over, however Niall detonates explosives, which eventually kills Tina Reilly. Jack is then arrested and Darren admits he knew of the fake death. They are both imprisoned. During his time in prison, the Osbornes are forced to sell The Dog to the Ashworths.

Jack and Darren are released from prison four months later. Jack visits Eamon's sons, Kris and Malachy Fisher, where he learns that Darren had only offered to buy them a drink as an apology. Darren is then kicked out of the flat. Jack grows depressed, and he does not want to leave the house. After learning that Darren took £100, 000 from Warren Fox to get stepbrother Jake to confess to Sean Kennedy's murder, before gambling the money away, Jack disowns him. Jack gets a manager job in the Dog thanks to Darren. When Jack sees that Darren has become close friends with teenager Duncan Button, he realises that he has changed, so decides to reconcile with him and offers him to move in with him, which would also include Duncan. Darren is delighted and happily accepts.

Darren and Hannah go on a rock 'n' roll weekend in Denmark. Darren breaks the news that he and Hannah married while drunk. Darren then uses his marital status to convince Nev to give him a job at The Dog as a barman and cancels the annulment as a means to get The Dog back. When Hannah goes to Darren's flat to watch a film, the pair end up sleeping together. Darren later ends his relationship with Hannah. While trying to save his wife Darren was stabbed from Jamie, after the couple run away. Darren offers to leave Hollyoaks with Hannah however she rejects his offer and leaves Hollyoaks alone. After Hannah's departure Darren, at Carmel and Calvin Valentine's wedding, Suzanne Ashworth arrives and spends the day flirting with Darren. They later sneak off and have sex. They resume their brief affair but are caught by Suzanne's son Rhys. Rhys attacks Darren before telling Neville about the affair, who kicks Suzanne out of their home.

The family supports Frankie and Steph when Steph reveals she is dying from cervical cancer. When Steph dies in a fire at Il Gnosh, they become deeply concerned for Frankie when she sets a table for Steph for Christmas dinner. On Christmas Eve, while taking the dog for a walk Jack and Duncan, discover India Longford's body.

In January 2011, the Osbornes have an intruder who Tom hits over the head, and it is later revealed that the intruder is in fact Frankie's granddaughter. The intruders father was Frankies son, born when she was 16, yet Frankie thought he had died. It is later revealed that Frankie's parents had told her the tot had died, but they then put him up for adoption. The family allow Esther Bloom to live with her. Darren begins a relationship with Nancy Hayton but it is cut short when In early 2011, Darren's ex-lover Suzanne returns, and announces that she's heavily pregnant with Darren's twins. She gives birth to on 21 January 2011 to Francine and Jack Osborne. Suzanne and the twins move into Nancy's flat, which leads Nancy to end their relationship. Suzanne leaves the village and while Nancy begins to console Darren, they reconcile. Darren and Nancy get married. Nancy finds out she pregnant but Nancy suffers a miscarriage. Nancy later discovers she is again pregnant with Darren's child. in October their son Oscar Osborne is born three months premature. Oscar is rushed to the neonatal intensive care unit following his birth and the doctors inform Darren and Nancy that their son may have brain damage and he may be disabled and he may be deaf and that he is fighting a serious infection he developed, necrotizing enterocolitis.[75] The family hold a christening and Darren and Nancy decide to name their son Oscar. in December, Darren and Nancy bring Oscar home for Christmas and have trouble settling him when he is crying. Darren drops a vase near Oscar who is sleeping. Oscar does not wake, causing Darren and Nancy concern. They consult the hospital who reveal that initial tests were inconclusive and further testing has revealed that Oscar is not responding to sound and is deaf. Oscar's deafness causes tension between Darren and Frankie, who fight, leading to Darren's walking out. Darren spends the day contemplating how Oscar would be affected by his deafness and begins learning sign language and buys specialist toys to support Oscar. Darren and Nancy think of getting cochlear implants for Oscar so he can hear but Nancy is put off by the operation. Despite this, Nancy eventually allows the operation to take place and in February 2014, Oscar has the operation and it is successful.

As of October 2015, the Osbornes are no longer the owners of the Dog in the Pond after an incident at Hollyoaks Pride (an event they were hosting on behalf of Tony Hutchinson) lead to the death of Doctor Charles S'Avage who, unbeknownst to the characters, was actually murdered by the Gloved Hand Killer (Lindsey Butterfield). Tony later tells Diane O'Connor that Jack could be potentially liable for the accident. Jack then reveals to Darren that he has sold the pub. The family then move into 17 Basswood Road, which had been formerly used for student accommodation.

Generations

Aggie Osborne, mother of Jack, Kenneth and Billy
Billy Brodie, half-brother of Jack and Kenneth
Eva Falco, daughter of Billy
Jack Osborne, brother of Kenneth and half-brother of Billy, married Celia Andersen; Jill Patrick; Frankie Dean: Darcy Wilde
Ruth Osborne, daughter of Jack and Celia, married Kurt Benson
Darren Osborne, son of Jack and Sandy Roscoe, married Hannah Ashworth, Nancy Hayton
Francine Osborne, daughter of Darren and Suzanne Ashworth
Jack Osborne, son of Darren and Suzanne
Oscar Osborne, son of Darren and Nancy
Morgan Osborne, daughter of Darren and Nancy
Bethany Cunningham, daughter of Jack and Dawn Cunningham
Kenneth Osborne, brother of Jack and half-brother of Billy, married Amanda Osborne
Natalie Osborne, daughter of Kenneth and Amanda
Rachel Osborne, daughter of Kenneth and Amanda

Reception
Bryan Kirkwood said "I love Jack and Frankie – they're essentially the heart of the show". Ashley Taylor Dawson has been nominated for his portrayal as part of the Osborne family at Inside Soap Awards including Funniest Performance in 2007, Best Actor in 2009 and for three awards in 2010 including Best Actor, Funniest Performance and Sexiest Male. Temporary workplace provider Regus carried out a survey in 2010 and found that Jack Osborne was the third most popular boss from Soaps.

References

External links
 Jack Osborne on the E4 website
 Darren Osborne on the E4 website
 Frankie Osborne on the E4 website
 Suzanne Ashworth on the E4 website
 Hannah Ashworth on the E4 website

O
Soap opera families

Fictional Scottish people
Television characters introduced in 1996